Wafa Wydad is a Moroccan football club currently play in the GNFA. The club was founded in 1944 and is located in the town of Casablanca.

Football clubs in Morocco
Football clubs in Casablanca
1944 establishments in Morocco
Sports clubs in Morocco